Samo's Empire (also known as Samo's Kingdom or Samo's State) is the historiographical name for the West Slavic tribal union established by King ("Rex") Samo, which existed between 623/631 and 658 in Central Europe. The extension of Samo's power, before and after 631 is disputable.

The centre of the union was most likely in Moravia and Nitravia (Nitra), additionally the union included Czech tribes, Sorbian tribes (under Dervan) and other West Slavic tribes along the river Danube (present Lower Austria). The polity has been called the first Slavic state.

Territory
It is generally believed that the tribal union included the regions of Moravia, Nitravia (Nitra), Silesia, Bohemia and Lusatia. According to Julius Bartl, the centre of the polity lay "somewhere in the area of southern Moravia, Lower Austria, and western Slovakia (Nitravia)".

According to J. B. Bury, "the assumption that his kingdom embraced Carantania, the country of the Alpine Slavs, rests only upon the Anonymus de conversione Bagariorum et Carantanorum".

Archaeological findings indicate that the empire was situated in present-day Moravia, Lower Austria and Slovakia. According to Slovak historian Richard Marsina, it is unlikely that the center of Samo's tribal union was in the whole territory of present-day Slovakia. The settlements of the later Moravian and Nitrian principalities (see: Great Moravia) are often identical with those from the time of Samo's Empire.

According to the findings of some German archaeologists, the core of Samo's state was located north of the Danube, and in the upper Main region. In some historical sources of the early 9th century, this region is described as "regio Sclavorum" or "terra Slavorum". Large amounts of early medieval Slavic ceramics are also found here. Many Slavic toponyms have also been found in this area, such as Winideheim ("The Hill of the Wends"), and Knetzburg (“Prince's Castle”).

Prelude
According to Fredegar, Samo, a Frankish merchant, went to the Slavs in  623–624. The dating has been questioned on the basis that the Wends would have most likely rebelled after the defeat of the Avars at the First Siege of Constantinople in 626. The Avars first arrived in the Pannonian Basin and subdued the local Slavs in the 560s. Samo may have been one of the merchants who supplied arms to the Slavs for their regular revolts. Whether he became king during a revolt of 623–24 or during the one which inevitably followed the Avar defeat in 626, he definitely took advantage of the latter to solidify his position. Samo went on to secure his throne by marriage into the major Wendish families, wedding at least twelve women and fathering twenty-two sons and fifteen daughters.

In 630–631, Valuk, the "duke of the Wends" was mentioned. These Wends referred to the Slavs of the Windic March, which according to some historians was the later March of Carinthia (Carantania) in present Slovenia and Austria. According to Jan Steinhubel, Valuk allowed Longobards to pass through his territory and attack Samo from south-west. Longobards were allies of Franks (Dagobert I) against Samo. If Valuk allowed Longobards to go through his territory, his principality could have not been part of Samo's empire.

History
The most famous event of Samo's career was his victory over the Frankish royal army under Dagobert I in 631 or 632. Provoked to action by a "violent quarrel in the Pannonian kingdom of the Avars or Huns", Dagobert led three armies against the Wends, the largest being his own Austrasian army. The Franks were routed near Wogastisburg; the majority of the besieging armies were slaughtered, while the rest of the troops fled, leaving weapons and other equipment lying on the ground. In the aftermath of the Wendish victory, Samo invaded Frankish Thuringia several times and undertook looting raids there. Dervan, the "duke of the Sorbs", initially subordinate to the Franks, joined the Slavic tribal union after Samo defeated Dagobert I. The Sorbs lived to the east of the Saxon Saale. Dervan participated in the subsequent wars against the Franks, successfully fighting against Frankish Thuringia (631–634), until he was finally defeated by Radulf of Thuringia in 636.

In 641, the rebellious Radulf sought an alliance with Samo against his sovereign, Sigebert III. Samo also maintained long-distance trade relationships. On his death, however, his title was not inherited by his sons. Ultimately, Samo can be credited with forging a Wendish identity by speaking on behalf of the community which recognised his authority.

Aftermath
The history of the tribal union after Samo's death in 658 or 659 is largely unclear, though it is generally assumed that it ended. Archaeological findings show that the Avars returned to their previous territories (at least to southernmost modern Slovakia) and entered into a symbiosis with the Slavs, whereas territories to the north of the Avar Khaganate were purely Slav territories. The first specific thing that is known about the fate of these Slavs and Avars is the existence of Moravian and Nitravian principalities in the late 8th century, which attacked the Avars, and the defeat of the Avars by the Franks under Charlemagne in 799 or 802–03, after which the Avars soon ceased to exist.

Great Moravia is viewed as a continuation or successor state to Samo's Empire. The polity has been called the first Slavic state.

See also
 Outline of Slavic history and culture

Notes

References

Sources

Primary sources
Chronicle of Fredegar (7th century)

Secondary sources
 
 

States and territories established in the 630s
States and territories disestablished in the 7th century
Former empires in Europe
West Slavic history
Medieval Slovakia
7th century in Europe
Barbarian kingdoms
Medieval Slovenia
7th-century establishments in Europe
7th-century disestablishments in Europe
631 establishments
658 disestablishments